The Mainichi Ōkan is a Grade 2 horse race in for Thoroughbred colts and fillies aged three and over run over a distance of 1,800 metres at Tokyo Racecourse.

The race is run in October and serves as a trial race for the autumn edition of the Tenno Sho.

It was first run in 1950 over 2500 metres. The distance was reduced to 2300 metres in 1959 and to 2000 metres in 1962 before the race was run over its current distance for the first time in 1984. It has been rated JRA Grade II since that year and was promoted to International Grade II in 2001. 2014, winner is received priority ballot for Tenno Sho (Autumn).

Among the winners of the race have been Katsuragi Ace, Oguri Cap, Bubble Gum Fellow, Silence Suzuka, Grass Wonder, Eishin Preston, Daiwa Major and A Shin Hikari

Records
Speed record:
1:44.1 Salios 2022

Most successful horse (2 wins):
 Oguri Cap – 1988, 1989
 Salios - 2020, 2022

Winners since 1994

Earlier winners

 1950 – Hatakaze
 1952 – Mitsuhata
 1952 – New Moana
 1953 – Track O
 1954 – Hakuryo
 1955 – Susquehanna
 1956 – Fair Manna
 1957 – Hakuchikara
 1958 – Hishi Maaru
 1959 – Kuripero
 1960 – Unebi Hikari
 1961 – Harrow More
 1962 – Emroan
 1963 – Yamano O
 1964 – Toast
 1965 – Umeno Chikara
 1966 – Theftway
 1967 – Tama Queen
 1968 – Shesky
 1969 – Takeshiba O
 1970 – Kurishiba
 1971 – Tokino Shin O
 1972 – Hustler
 1973 – Takuma O
 1974 – Takekuma Hikaru
 1975 – White Fontaine
 1976 – Harbor Young
 1977 – C B Queen
 1978 – Press Toko
 1979 – C B Cross
 1980 – Kane Minobu
 1981 – Juji Arrow
 1982 – Kyoei Promise
 1983 – Takara Tenryu
 1984 – Katsuragi Ace
 1985 – Gold Way
 1986 – Sakura Yutaka O
 1987 – Dyna Actress
 1988 – Oguri Cap
 1989 – Oguri Cap
 1990 – Lucky Guerlain
 1991 – Prekrasnie
 1992 – Daitako Helios
 1993 – Shinko Lovely

See also
 Horse racing in Japan
 List of Japanese flat horse races

References

Turf races in Japan